Players and pairs who neither have high enough rankings nor receive wild cards may participate in a qualifying tournament held one week before the annual Wimbledon Tennis Championships.

The qualifying tournament was held from 18 to 20 June 1996 in the England Sports Grounds in Roehampton, United Kingdom.

Seeds

  Flora Perfetti (qualifying competition, lucky loser)
  María Vento (first round)
 n/a
  Rachel McQuillan (first round)
  Nanne Dahlman (second round)
  Aleksandra Olsza (qualifying competition, lucky loser)
  Annabel Ellwood (qualified)
  Erika deLone (second round)
  Petra Langrová (qualifying competition)
  Laxmi Poruri (first round)
  Sonya Jeyaseelan (first round)
  Isabelle Demongeot (first round)
  Silvija Talaja (qualifying competition)
  Anne Kremer (qualified)
  Tina Križan (second round)
  Maria Strandlund (qualifying competition)
  Caroline Dhenin (second round)

Qualifiers

  Mercedes Paz
  Annabel Ellwood
  Kerry-Anne Guse
  Anne Kremer
  Maureen Drake
  Laura Golarsa
  Amélie Cocheteux
  Cătălina Cristea

Lucky losers

  Flora Perfetti
  Aleksandra Olsza

Qualifying draw

First qualifier

Second qualifier

Third qualifier

Fourth qualifier

Fifth qualifier

Sixth qualifier

Seventh qualifier

Eighth qualifier

References

External links

1996 Wimbledon Championships on WTAtennis.com
1996 Wimbledon Championships – Women's draws and results at the International Tennis Federation

Women's Singles Qualifying
Wimbledon Championship by year – Women's singles qualifying
Wimbledon Championships